Love, Me (stylized in sentence case) is the debut extended play (EP) by Canadian singer Lennon Stella. The EP was released on November 16, 2018 by Columbia Records. Stella collaborated with six musicians during the production of Love, Me, including American producer Greg Kurstin and New Zealand producer Joel Little. Four tracks were issued as singles from the EP: "Bad", "Breakaway", "La Di Da", and "Feelings". Love, Me follows Stella's appearance on the song "Polaroid" with English producer Jonas Blue and One Direction vocalist Liam Payne.

Track listing

Charts

References

2018 debut EPs
Columbia Records EPs
Albums produced by busbee
Albums produced by Stint (producer)
Albums produced by Joel Little
Albums produced by Greg Kurstin
Albums produced by Sam de Jong
Lennon Stella albums